The Railroad Cottage is a historic house at 208 North Rust Street in Gentry, Arkansas.  It is a small single-story L-shaped wood-frame house with Folk Victorian styling, including a reconstructed jigsawn balustrade and turned porch posts.  The house was built c. 1900, and is one of the best-preserved small houses built at the time to support an influx of people working in the fruit and railroad industries.  Buried under a series of 20th-century alterations, the core of the house was discovered when demolition of the building began in 1997, and has been carefully restored as best architectural preservation practices could determine its original appearance to be.

The building was listed on the National Register of Historic Places in 2005.

See also
National Register of Historic Places listings in Benton County, Arkansas

References

Houses on the National Register of Historic Places in Arkansas
Victorian architecture in Arkansas
Houses completed in 1900
Houses in Benton County, Arkansas
National Register of Historic Places in Benton County, Arkansas
1900 establishments in Arkansas
Gentry, Arkansas